Deez to Blues is an album by bassist/composer Mario Pavone recorded in 2005 and released on the Playscape label.

Reception

Allmusic called it an "excellent, forward-thinking date ... Mixing orchestral flourishes with a post-bop vocabulary and a decidedly experimental sensibility, Pavone's music is both highbrow and visceral at once". The Penguin Guide to Jazz selected this album as part of its suggested Core Collection. On All About Jazz Troy Collins observed, "Pavone's swinging, multi-layered compositions push the tradition forward while always looking back" and said "Deez to Blues is a high water mark in a consistently exceptional discography". JazzTimes reviewer Brent Burton commented " Though never noisy or atonal, Blues is impossible to tune out, impossible to turn down. It demands nothing less than your undivided attention".

Track listing
All compositions by Mario Pavone except where noted.
 "Zines" – 7:44
 "Deez" – 7:18
 "Xapo" – 9:41
 "Dances 3/5" – 7:20
 "Day of the Dark Bright Light" (Marty Ehrlich) – 5:17
 "Ocbo" – 5:12
 "Second-Term Blues" – 7:12

Personnel
Mario Pavone – bass
Steven Bernstein – trumpet, slide trumpet, arranger
Howard Johnson – tuba, baritone saxophone, bass clarinet
Charles Burnham – violin
Peter Madsen – piano
Michael Sarin – drums

References

2006 albums
Mario Pavone albums